In mineralogy, tenacity is a mineral's behavior when deformed or broken.

Common terms
Brittleness:
The mineral breaks or powders easily. Most ionic-bonded minerals are brittle.

Malleability:
The mineral may be pounded out into thin sheets. Metallic-bonded minerals are usually malleable.

Ductility:
The mineral may be drawn into a wire. Ductile materials have to be malleable as well as tough.

Sectility:
May be cut smoothly with a knife. Relatively few minerals are sectile. Sectility is a form of tenacity and can be used to distinguish minerals of similar appearance. Gold, for example, is sectile but pyrite ("fool's gold") is not.

Elasticity:
If bent, will spring back to its original position when the stress is released.

Plasticity:
If bent, will not spring back to its original position when the stress is released. It stays bent. In contrast, flexibility is the ability of a material to deform elastically and return to its original shape when the applied stress is removed.

References

Mineralogy
Deformation (mechanics)
Materials science